Sebaldeburen is a village in the Westerkwartier municipality in the Dutch province of Groningen. It had a population of around 590 in January 2017.

History 
The village was first mentioned in the 13th century as "in Sibaldebuere hove", and means "settlement of Sibald (person)". Sebaldeburen is a road village which developed in the Middle Ages on a sandy ridge.

The Dutch Reformed church was built in 1807. The polder mill De Eendracht dates from 1887 as the replacement of a mill from 1801 which burnt down.

Sebaldeburen used to be the capital of the  region. In 1811 it became part of the municipality of Grootegast. It was home to 278 people in 1840.

Gallery

References

External links 

Westerkwartier
Westerkwartier (municipality)
Populated places in Groningen (province)